The Yarra River is a river in southern Victoria, Australia; which flows through the city of Melbourne. Over the river's  length there are many structures that bridge the river.

Crossings
The following is a partial list of structures have spanned the Yarra River in order of closest to the mouth of the river in Hobsons Bay.

 There are also a number of ferries that cross the Yarra at various points such as the West Gate Ferry and Herring Island Punt.

See also

 Geography of the Yarra River

References

External links
 Collection of photos of bridges over the Yarra River

 
Bridges in Victoria (Australia)
Lists of bridges in Australia
Lists of buildings and structures in Victoria (Australia)
Lists of river crossings